The Bitter Truth is a 1917 American silent drama film directed by Kenean Buel and starring Virginia Pearson, Jack Hopkins and William H. Tooker.

Cast
 Virginia Pearson as Anne 
 Jack Hopkins as Graves, a parson 
 William H. Tooker as Judge Marcus 
 Alice May as Martha Marcus 
 Sidney D'Albrook as The Parson

References

Bibliography
 Solomon, Aubrey. The Fox Film Corporation, 1915-1935: A History and Filmography. McFarland, 2011.

External links
 

1917 films
1917 drama films
1910s English-language films
American silent feature films
Silent American drama films
American black-and-white films
Films directed by Kenean Buel
Fox Film films
1910s American films